Ghaao was a 2013 Pakistani romantic drama serial broadcast on Geo TV every Monday and Tuesday. Serial was written by Faiza Iftikhar and directed by Aamir Yousuf, starring Sami Khan, Fiza Ali and Samina Peerzada.

Cast 
 Sami Khan as Mohid
 Fiza Ali as Alizeh
 Samina Peerzada as Zarqa
 Faiza Jaffery as Areesha
 Saniya Shamshad as Aleesha

Story 
Ghaao is crammed with conflict between real and step blood relationship with assortment of Love and revenge. Alizeh and Areesha live with their mother Naseema who is not in an exceedingly good state of health with respect to her psychological condition. 
 
Alizeh realizes her responsibility and is supporting the family. She meets a psychiatrist named Mohid and each become friends. Mohid tries to help Naseema and Alizeh when he understands what state of affairs they are currently in. Mohid and Alizeh begin to like each other and eventually marry.

On the opposite hand Areesha is immature and less wise than her sister. She is trapped in an affair with a dangerous man.

Mohid's mother Zarqa is ruthless and cold-hearted. She is married to Sajjad who is currently paralyzed.

Zarqa tries to stop Mohid from marrying Alizeh, however Mohid doesn't listen to her. After Alizeh marries Mohid she experiences flashbacks which hold a certain mystery and holds the key to her past which is not thus pleasant.

References

External links 
 Ghaao's official website

Geo TV original programming
Urdu-language television shows
Pakistani drama television series
2013 Pakistani television series debuts